A list of books and essays about the Coen brothers:

Coen